The AmaNdlambe or the Ndlambe is a Xhosa chiefdom located in the Eastern Cape, South Africa. Founded by Chief Ndlambe, son of Chief Rharhabe and grandson of King Phalo, Ndlambe's advisors and strong army were known as the 'AmaNdlambe'. Chief Ndlambe was also the uncle of King Hintsa.

History of the chiefdom

Ndlambe was the second born son from Great-Chief Rharhabe's great wife Queen Nojoli of the AbaThembu. Rharhabe's heir who was supposed to be the ruler of the Right Hand House following Rharhabe's death was called Mlawu. It is said that on the day that Mlawu was to marry his great wife Nobutho, he suddenly became ill and died. However, on his death Mlawu had fathered two sons out of wedlock i.e. Ngqika and Ntimbo.

When Great-Chief Rharhabe died in battle, Ndlambe was requested by the councillors of Mlawu to provide them with an heir for the great house. Ndlambe knowing that his brother had fathered two sons, sought out the two boys in order that one would rule over the Rharhabe House. Indeed, the two children were found and thus the sons of his deceased elder brother were brought by the councillors to Ndlambe's kraal to select a successor.

It became apparent that Ndlambe favoured Ngqika over Ntimbo, as even though Ntimbo appeared the eldest of the two, he exhibited a sickly disposition. The councillors of Mlawu favoured Ntimbo, as it would enhance their own powers over the great house if Ntimbo were to succeed the kingship.

This dispute was referred to the Great House of the Kingdom, to be decided by the King Khawuta. Whilst a delegation was sent to King Khawuta to formally request his assistance; Ndlambe sent an informal party to the king requesting that Ngqika be selected new ruler of the Rharhabe. In preparation for the arrival of the king, festivities lasting several days commenced where the two young princes were fêted. When King Khawuta arrived and having received word from Ndlambe on the suitability of one of the two young princes by the name of Ngqika; King Khawuta accompanied by his councillors, did not even utter a word but merely got off his horse, bestowed Ngqika around his neck with a string of royal beads, got back on his horse and left. The simple gesture by the king laid the whole matter to rest and Ngqika became ruler of the Right Hand House of the Xhosa Kingdom.

During the minority of Ngqika, Ndlambe became regent, assisted at times by the young chief's mother Yese; a woman largely known for her salacious appetite in men and would in later years have a great and negative influence during her son's reign. She had a notorious relationship with the Xhosa interpreter and colourful figure Coenraad de Buys, which did not sit well within the conservative Xhosa society.

Ndlambe was a popular and much loved regent having seen a great expansion and rise in the fortunes of the Rharhabe. He ruled as regent for a period spanning over twenty years, and is viewed by some historians as the main architect of chiefly greatness.

As Ndlambe was teaching the young Ngqika the art of being a fine ruler, Ngqika who now had just emerged from the Xhosa custom of ukwaluka, sought to take the sovereignty from his uncle by force, suspected to have been at the influence of his mother Yese and his father's old councillors, who had hinted to the impressionable young chief that Ndlambe sought to usurp his throne.

As the tensions grew, Ndlambe left the great place which at the time was located at Xhukwane, Debe Nek with his councillors and a number of followers loyal to him and settled at Xuxuwa near today Fort Beaufort.

Shortly thereafter, as Ndlambe's popularity grew, Ngqika overcome with jealousy led an unwarranted and surprise attack on Ndlambe where he defeated Ndlambe's forces. Ndlambe escaped unscathed and went to hide amongst his mother's people the AbaThembu of Ndungwana at Ngqamakhwe.

Ndlambe appealed to the AbaThembu to assist him against his volatile nephew, but only received help from his senior, the regent of the Xhosa Kingdom Nqoko; at the time the Xhosa King, King Khawuta had died and his heir Hintsa was still a young boy. The two armies met at Tyusha near the Cwengcwe, where the Nqoko's forces were routed by the amaNgqika forces and Ngqika captured Ndlambe and Hintsa as his prisoners and kept them as prisoners at Ndlambe's sister Ntsusa's homestead near the Rhabula River.

The Great House also moved out of their territory near Ngxingxolo across the Kei River to present day Willowvale, where the Gcaleka monarch is still found today.

Hintsa managed to escape from captivity and crossed the Kei to the great delight of his countrymen. Ndlambe, although a prisoner, was allowed free movement by Ngqika that three of his young wives Thuthula, Noyena, and Nojico were allowed to join him. Ngqika would also from time to time consult his uncle and request his presence on matters of state.

Ndlambe was finally rescued with his wives from captivity with the assistance of prince Chungwa of the Gqunukwebe and settled near Chungwa's great place in Mnyameni. As Ndlambe was much feared and respect by his Xhosa people; his army, councillors and many of his loyal subjects soon followed him to Mnyameni.

It is then that the AmaNdlambe chiefdom was re-established.

References 

Bennie, W.G; Imibengo 1960. Lovedale Press, South Africa
Peires, J.B; The House of Phalo 1981. Ravan Press, South Africa

Xhosa-speaking peoples